Don Quijote cabalga de nuevo is a 1973 Spanish-Mexican comedy film directed by Roberto Gavaldón, loosely based on Miguel de Cervantes's novel Don Quixote and starring Cantinflas as Sancho Panza, Fernando Fernán Gómez as Don Quixote, and María Fernanda D'Ocón as Dulcinea.

Plot
Don Quijote is obsessed with chivalry and its codes of honour. Accompanied by his peculiar squire Sancho Panza, he embarks on a series of adventures in which he is mocked and tricked by some, while others try to help him recover his sanity. But neither Don Quixote nor Sancho give up trying to protect humanity.

Cast
Cantinflas as Sancho Panza
Fernando Fernán Gómez as Alonso Quijano "Don Quijote"
María Fernanda D'Ocón as Aldonza Lorenzo "Dulcinea del Toboso"
Paca Gabaldón as Altisidora (credited as Mary Francis)
Ricardo Merino as Bachelor Sansón Carrasco
José Orjas as Judge
Emilio Laguna as Duke
Alberto Fernández as Pedro Pérez, the parish priest
Laly Soldevila as Duchess
María Luisa Ponte as Landlady of Don Alonso Quijano
Serafín García Vázquez
Valeriano Andrés as Master Nicholas, the barber (credited as Valeriano de Andres)
Rafael Hernández as Young man in the street with Aldonza
Manuel Alexandre as Young man in court case tried by Sancho Panza
Luis Morris as Angulo the Bad, comedian
Agustín González as Duke's Butler
Valentín Tornos as Baldomero Fernández, notary
Diana Lorys as Young woman in court case tried by Sancho Panza
Javier Escrivá as Miguel de Cervantes

Filming locations
Peñaranda de Duero
Talamanca de Jarama
Villaseca de Uceda
Torrelaguna
Manzanares el Real
La Pedriza
El Romeral
Consuegra
Puerto de Despeñaperros
Estudios Cinematográficos Roma, Madrid, Spain
Palacio de Avellaneda

Awards and honors
The film was shown in the 2019 edition of the San Sebastian International Film Festival as part of a retrospective of Roberto Gavaldón's work.

References

Bibliography
de Paranaguá, Paulo Antonio. Mexican Cinema. British Film Institute, 1995.

External links

Spanish comedy films
Mexican comedy films
Films based on Don Quixote
1970s adventure films
1973 drama films
1973 films
1970s buddy films
1970s Mexican films
1970s Spanish films